Saint-Jean-du-Corail is a former commune in the Manche department in Normandy in north-western France. On 1 January 2016, it was merged into the new commune of Mortain-Bocage. Its population was 237 in 2019.

See also
Communes of the Manche department
Parc naturel régional Normandie-Maine

References

Saintjeanducorail